Çakır is a Turkish surname, that derives from colour blue. It was often associated with people who had blue eyes, which are uncommon in Turkey. Notable people with the surname include:

Aslı Çakır Alptekin (born 1985), Turkish female middle distance runner
Cüneyt Çakır (born 1976), Turkish UEFA Elite association football referee
Hamza Çakır (born 1985), German football player of Turkish descent
Mehmet Çakır (born 1984), Turkish footballer
Mihail Ciachir (1861 – 1938), Moldovan and Gagauz Protoiereus
Mustafa Çakır (born 1986), Turkish yacht racer
Olcay Çakır (born 1993), Turkish female basketball player
Petro Chakyr (1931 – 2012), Ukrainian painter
Sabri Çakır (born 1955), German poet of Turkish origin
Seher Çakır (born 1971), Turkish woman poet

Places
 Çakır, Acıpayam, in Turkey
 Çakır, Çorum, a town in Turkey
 Çakır, Yenice, in Turkey

Other uses
 Çakır (missile), Turkish cruise missile

See also 
 Çakırağa Mansion, mansion in Turkey

Turkish-language surnames